Ashaga-Tsinit is a rural locality (a selo) in Ashaga-Arkhitsky Selsoviet, Khivsky District, Republic of Dagestan, Russia. The population was 789 as of 2010.

Geography 
Ashaga-Tsinit is located 9 km southeast of Khiv (the district's administrative centre) by road. Ashaga-Arkhit is the nearest rural locality.

References 

Rural localities in Khivsky District